KINN (1270 AM) is a radio station  broadcasting a News Talk Information format. Licensed to Alamogordo, New Mexico, United States, the station is currently owned by Burt Broadcasting and features programming from Fox News Radio, Compass Media Networks, Genesis Communications Network, Premiere Networks, USA Radio Network, and Westwood One.

History
The station was assigned the call letters KZZX on 1 September 1986. On 1 September 1991, the station changed its call sign to the current KINN.

References

External links
FCC History Cards for KINN

INN
Radio stations established in 1986
1986 establishments in New Mexico